The Roman Catholic Diocese of Koszalin-Kołobrzeg is a Latin rite suffragan diocese in the Ecclesiastical province of the Metropolitan Archdiocese of Szczecin-Kamień in northwestern Poland. It has its cathedral episcopal see is the Katedra Niepokalanego Poczęcia NMP, in Koszalin, as well as a Co-Cathedral, which is the Minor Basilica: Bazylika Konkatedralna Wniebowzięcia NMP, in Kołobrzeg, both in Zachodniopomorskie, and a former Cathedral: Katedra Świętej Rodziny Katedra Świętej Rodziny, in Piła, in Wielkopolskie.

Statistics 
As per 2014, it pastorally served 822,058 Catholics (90.0% of 912,929 total) on 14,640 km² in 220 parishes with 574 priests (439 diocesan, 135 religious), 367 lay religious (142 brothers, 225 sisters) and 53 seminarians. According to the Polish Institute of the Catholic Church Statistics, weekly mass attendance was 25% in 2013 making the diocese the second least devoutly religious one in Poland after the Archdiocese of Szczecin-Kamień.

Precursor bishopric of Kołobrzeg 

In 1000 the Diocese of Kołobrzeg was established in Kołobrzeg by Polish ruler Bolesław I the Brave, along with the dioceses of Wrocław and Kraków and the Archdiocese of Gniezno, as one of the oldest Polish dioceses (the only older diocese being the diocese of Poznań, established in 968).

In 1015 it was however suppressed, its territory being reassigned partly to the Metropolitan Archdiocese of Gniezno (from 1145 however signed over to the exempt Diocese of Kammin, and partly to establish the Diocese of Kujawy–Pomorze (which would merge into aforementioned Gniezno). Only one residential bishop of Kołobrzeg is recorded: Reinbern (1000 – 1007), died 1013.

History 
 1945 - part of Apostolic Administration of Kamień, Lubusz and the Prelature of Piła
 Established on June 28, 1972 as Diocese of Koszalin – Kołobrzeg, part of the ecclesiastical province of Gniezno, on territories split off from the Diocese of Berlin and from parts of the suppressed Territorial Prelature of Piła, but formally restoring the Kołobrzeg diocese.
 Enjoyed a Papal visit from the Polish Pope John Paul II in June 1991.
 Gained territory on 1992.03.25 from the Roman Catholic Diocese of Zielona Góra-Gorzów, retroceedimg at the same time eastern deaneries to the Roman Catholic Diocese of Chełmno, and made part of the ecclesiastical province of Szczecin-Kamień
 Lost territory on 2004.02.24 to establish the Diocese of Bydgoszcz

Episcopal ordinaries
(all Roman rite) 
Suffragan Bishops of Koszalin-Kołobrzeg 
 Ignacy Ludwik Jeż (1972.06.28 – retired 1992.02.01), died 2006; previously Titular Bishop of Alba marittima (1960.04.20 – 1972.06.28), first as Auxiliary Bishop of Archdiocese of Gniezno (Gnesen, Poland) (1960.04.20 – 1967), then as Auxiliary Bishop of Archdiocese of Wrocław (Breslau, Poland) (1967 – 1972.06.28)
 Czesław Domin (1992.02.01 – death 1996.03.15), previously Titular Bishop of Dagnum (1970.06.06 – 1992.02.01) as Auxiliary Bishop of Diocese of Katowice (Poland) (1970.06.06 – 1992.02.01)
 Marian Gołębiewski (1996.07.20 – 2004.04.03), next Metropolitan Archbishop of Wrocław (Poland) (2004.04.03 – retired 2013.05.18)
 Kazimierz Nycz (2004.06.09 – 2007.03.03), previously Titular Bishop of Villa regis (1988.05.14 – 2004.06.09) as Auxiliary Bishop of Archdiocese of Kraków (Cracovia, Poland) (1988.05.14 – 2004.06.09); later Metropolitan Archbishop of Warszawa (Poland) (2007.03.03 – ...), Ordinary of Poland of the Eastern Rite (2007.06.09 – ...), created Cardinal-Priest of Ss. Silvestro e Martino ai Monti (2010.11.20 [2011.04.29] – ...)
 Edward Dajczak (2007.06.23 – ), previously Titular Bishop of Azura (1989.12.15 – 2007.06.23) as Auxiliary Bishop of Diocese of Zielona Góra-Gorzów (Poland) (1989.12.15 – 2007.06.23).

See also 
 List of Catholic dioceses in Poland
 Roman Catholicism in Poland

References

Sources and external links 
 GCatholic.org, with Google map and satellite photo - data for all sections
 Catholic Hierarchy
 Diocesan website

Roman Catholic dioceses in Poland
Religious organizations established in 1972
Kołobrzeg
Roman Catholic dioceses and prelatures established in the 20th century